Terry Graham Garbett (born 9 September 1945) is an English retired footballer who played for Middlesbrough, Watford, Blackburn Rovers and Sheffield United in England, as well as the New York Cosmos in the United States.

External links
Player profile at The Crossed Blades
New York Cosmos stats

1945 births
Living people
English footballers
Middlesbrough F.C. players
Watford F.C. players
Blackburn Rovers F.C. players
Sheffield United F.C. players
New York Cosmos players
People from Lanchester, County Durham
Footballers from County Durham
North American Soccer League (1968–1984) players
Association football midfielders
English expatriate sportspeople in the United States
Expatriate soccer players in the United States
English expatriate footballers